Beverly Manor School, Beverly Manor Elementary School, or Beverly Manor Middle School may refer to:

 Beverly Manor Middle School, a grade school of District 50 Schools (Tazewell County, Illinois) in Washington
 Beverly Manor Elementary School and Beverly Manor Middle School, grade schools of Augusta County Public Schools in Staunton, Virginia